A loft is a type of room or dwelling.

Loft, LOFT, or The Loft may also refer to:

Geography
 Loft Crag, mountain in the English Lake District

Brands and enterprises
 Loft (store), a Japanese chain store
 LOFT, a division of Ann Taylor (clothing retailer)
 Loft, Inc., a former candy making and retailing concern
 The Loft (New York City), a New York nightclub
"The Loft Miami" complex, comprising "The Loft" and "The Loft 2", residential skyscrapers in Miami

Arts, entertainment, and media

Films 
 Loft (2005 film), a 2005 Japanese film
 Loft (2007 film), a 2007 Indian Malayalam-language film, see List of films released in Malaysia (2007)
 Loft (2008 film), a 2008 Belgian film
 Loft (2010 film), a 2010 Dutch film (remake of the Belgian film)
 The Loft (2014 film), an American film (remake of the Belgian film)

Music 
 Loft (band), a German Eurodance band
 The Loft (British band), a British indie band
 The Loft (Danish band), a Danish band

Other uses in arts, entertainment, and media
 The Loft (Sirius XM), a music channel on satellite radio

Science and technology
 Loft (3D), a 3D modeling technique
 LOFT (LOCA), a study of behavior of nuclear fuel during loss of fluid or loss of coolant in a reactor
 LOFT or Large Observatory For X-ray Timing, a proposed high-energy astronomy space mission

Other uses
 Loft, a measure of density of down or other insulating material
  Loft, the angle between a golf club's face and the vertical plane
 Line-oriented flight training or LOFT, a type of training in a flight simulator
 Loft bed, a type of bunk bed
 Pigeon loft, housing for domestic pigeons
 Loft (building), a type of medieval building in Norway

See also
 Hugh Lofting (1886–1947), British author who created Doctor Dolittle
 Lofting (bowling), curving ball
 Lofting, the process of drawing up blueprints for boats/ships using a table of derivatives
 Lofty (disambiguation)
 L0pht, pronounced "loft", a former hacker collective centered in Boston, MA